Alvar (also Romanized as Alwar) is a village in Karvan-e Olya Rural District, Karvan District, Tiran and Karvan County, Isfahan Province, Iran. At the 2006 census, its population was 670, in 172 families.

References 

Populated places in Tiran and Karvan County